The 1999 Speedway Conference League was the third tier/division of British speedway.

Summary
The title was won by Newport Mavericks, the junior club belonging to the Newport Wasps.

Final league table

Conference League Knockout Cup
The 1999 Conference League Knockout Cup was the second edition of the Knockout Cup for tier three teams. St Austell Gulls were the winners for the second successive year.

First round

Final

Other Honours
Conference League Riders' Championship - Jonathan Swales (Linlithgow)

See also
List of United Kingdom Speedway League Champions
Knockout Cup (speedway)

References

Conference
Speedway Conference League